Okoyo   is a district in the Cuvette-Ouest Department, Republic of the Congo.

Towns and villages

Cuvette Department
Districts of the Republic of the Congo